STARK Group is one of the largest retailers and distributors of building materials for the professional segment in Europe with approx. 20,000 employees and 1,150 branches and distribution centres. Headquartered at Frederiksberg, Denmark, STARK Group owns and operates six builders’ merchant chains STARK Building Materials UK, with Jewson as the most significant brand, in the United Kingdom. , STARK Deutschland GmbH in Germany and Austria, STARK Danmark in Denmark and Greenland, Beijer Byggmaterial AB in Sweden, STARK Suomi Oy in Finland, and Neumann Bygg A/S in Norway.

History
STARK Group was founded in 1896, under the name Århus Trælasthandel A/S. Following an expansion of the company, organizationally as well as geographically, the group was – in 1918 – listed on the stock exchange and 1918 and changed its name to Det Danske Trælastkompagni. In 1968, the group established the first DIY market Silvan to the do-it-yourself consumer, which became the group's first subsidiary.

In 1989 the group expanded geographically by acquiring the Swedish builders’ merchant Beijer Byggmaterial AB that became the group's second subsidiary. Seven years later – in 1996 – the group expanded into the Norwegian market as it acquired the Norwegian builders' merchant Neumann Bygg, and in July 2000 the Finnish based Starkki became a new member of the group. By the time of 2004 Danske Trælast was the parent company of a huge group that besides the four Nordic subsidiaries was responsible for 75 timberyards in Denmark. These were gathered under the name STARK that became the fifth subsidiary. In 2006 the group changed its name into DT Group A/S and was sold to the English firm Ferguson.

As of 2017 the first subsidiary, Silvan, was sold to a German private equity fund. The same year the Group changed its name to STARK Group. A year later – in 2018 – the Group was sold to the American Private Equity fund Lone Star. In 2019 STARK Group acquired the German builders' merchant Saint Gobain Building Distribution Deutschland GmbH and became the largest retailer and distributor of building materials in Northern Europe. In 2021 CVC Capital Partners acquired STARK Group from Lone Star.

In December 2022, Saint-Gobain sold the UK-based Jewson group to STARK Group for £740m. The sale included Northern Ireland local brands Gibbs & Dandy and JP Corry, specialist brands Jewson Civil Frazer and Minster, and International Timber.

Employment
As of March 2023 STARK Group had more than 20,000 employees spread across 6 subsidiaries and the headquarters. The Group employs approx. 9000 in STARK Building Materials UK, 6500 in STARK Deutschland, 2500 employees in STARK Denmark, 2400 in Beijer Byggmaterial, 1100 in STARK Suomi and 350 in Neumann Bygg.

Strategy 
As part of STARK Group's strategic journey, the organizational structure in 2017 was simplified and a clear strategic vision was formed. Part of STARK Group's new strategic vision consists of a consistent focus on a core customer group of small and medium-sized enterprises (SMEs). In addition, STARK Group serves large construction companies and other types of professional clients, such as government agencies and a small proportion of do-it-yourself clients.

For more than 100 years, the companies in the group have been developing and strengthening their business base. Today STARK Group holds a substantial position in the construction industry, not only as a provider of products but also as an active player providing valuable services and advice to the professionals’ builders in the Nordic countries.

Ownership 
STARK Group is owned by CVC Capital Partners Fund VII. CVC Capital Partners is a private equity and investment advisory firm. Earlier on, STARK Group was owned by the American private equity firm Lone Star Funds.

On January 8, 2021 CVC Capital Partners announced their complete acquisition of STARK Group.

References

External links
 Official website

Wholesalers of Denmark
Building materials companies of Denmark
Retail companies based in Copenhagen
Retail companies established in 1896
Danish companies established in 1896
Companies based in Frederiksberg Municipality